George Farmer may refer to:

George Farmer (Royal Navy officer) (1732–1779), officer of the Royal Navy
George Farmer (footballer, born 1862) (1862–?), footballer who played for Stoke City
George Farmer (footballer, born 1863) (1863–1905), Wales international footballer who played for Everton
George Farmer (luger) (born 1938), American Olympic luger
George Farmer (wide receiver, born 1948), American football player for the Chicago Bears and Detroit Lions, college basketball player
George Farmer (wide receiver, born 1958), American football player for the Los Angeles Rams and Miami Dolphins 
George Farmer (running back) (born 1993), American football player for the Seattle Seahawks
George Farmer (aquascaper), British aquascaper
 Buck Farmer (George Runie Farmer, born 1991), American baseball pitcher

See also

Farmer George